Van Stockumberg is a mountain in Suriname at . It is part of the Emma Range and is located in the Sipaliwini District. It is named after the Dutch explorer A. J. van Stockum. It is next to the Voltzberg, however the Van Stockumberg is much more difficult to climb.

References

Inselbergs of South America
Mountains of Suriname